Keith Peters (born 19 July 1915, date of death unknown) was an English footballer who played as a defender. He was born in Port Sunlight, England in July 1915.

References

1915 births
Year of death missing
English footballers
Liverpool F.C. players
English Football League players
Brighton & Hove Albion F.C. wartime guest players
Association football defenders
Sportspeople from Wirral
Footballers from Merseyside